The 2003 Liberal Party of Canada leadership election ended on November 14, 2003, electing former Finance Minister Paul Martin as the party's new leader, replacing outgoing Prime Minister Jean Chrétien.

Stakes for the race were high as the winner would go on to become prime minister, in addition to leading a party that was high in the polls without a significant challenger.

Paul Martin spent the entire race as the front runner, as his supporters had secured a lock on the party executives of the federal and most provincial sections of the party. Because of Martin's apparent strength, several prominent candidates, such as Allan Rock, and Brian Tobin, did not go beyond the formative stages.

Martin's only serious challengers were John Manley and Sheila Copps, the former of whom withdrew before delegate selection began. Martin easily captured the leadership with 93.8% of the delegates.

The party would be beset by significant infighting afterwards, as he and his supporters moved to remove Chrétien supporters from cabinet and even from Parliament. Martin's initial tactics to secure the leadership were generally seen, in retrospect, as weakening his eventual tenure as prime minister.

Timeline

2002
June 2 - Paul Martin resigns as Finance Minister of Canada. John Manley is named to replace him.
August 21 - Prime Minister Jean Chrétien tells Canadians he will step down in February 2004.

2003
February 13 - Sheila Copps announces she is going to run for leadership.
March 7 - Martin announces he is going to run for leadership.
March 17 - Manley announces he is going to run for leadership.
July 22 - Manley drops out of the race.
September 21 - Paul Martin's victory becomes a certainty when he secures 92% of the party delegates from across the country.
November 14 - Martin officially becomes leader of the Liberal Party of Canada winning 3,242 of 3,455 votes against Copps.
November 28 - Manley announces his retirement from politics.
December 12 - Martin is sworn in as Canada's prime minister, along with his cabinet.

Candidates

Sheila Copps 

Background
MP for Hamilton East, Ontario (1984–2004)Deputy Prime Minister (1993–1996, 1996–1997)Minister of the Environment (1993–1996)Minister of the Multiculturalism and Citizenship (1996)Minister of the Communications (1996)Minister of Canadian Heritage (1996–2003)Minister of Amateur Sport (1996–1999)Copps, 50, was a candidate during the 1990 leadership election, finishing in third.
Date campaign launched:  February 13, 2003

Paul Martin 

Background
MP for LaSalle—Émard, Quebec (1988–2008)Minister of Finance (1993–2002)Minister responsible for the Economic Development Agency of Canada for the Regions of Quebec (1993–1996)Martin, 65, was a candidate during the 1990 leadership election, finishing in second.Martin's loss during the 1990 leadership election result and Jean Chrétien's slim win during the 1997 election led to a period of infighting within the party, with Martin leaving cabinet in June 2002, and Chrétien, in the face of a leadership review, announcing his intention to step down February 2004.
Date campaign launched:  March 7, 2003

Withdrawn candidates

John Manley 

Background
MP for Ottawa South, Ontario (1988–2004)Deputy Prime Minister (2002–2003)Minister of Industry, Science and Technology (1993–1995)Minister of Consumer and Corporate Affairs (1993–1995)Minister of Industry (1995–2000)Minister of Foreign Affairs (2000–2002)Minister of Finance (2002–2003) Manley, 53, withdrew from the race on July 22, 2003 and endorsed Martin.
Date campaign launched:  March 17, 2003
Date campaign ended:  July 22, 2003

Endorsements

Declined to run
Don Boudria, MP for Glengarry—Prescott—Russell and Leader of the Government in the House of Commons
Martin Cauchon, MP for Outremont and Minister of Justice and Attorney General
Herb Dhaliwal, MP for Vancouver South—Burnaby and Minister of Natural Resources
Frank McKenna, former Premier of New Brunswick
Anne McLellan, MP for Edmonton Centre and Minister of Health
Dennis Mills, MP for Toronto—Danforth
Maria Minna, MP for Beaches—East York
Pierre Pettigrew, MP for Papineau—Saint-Denis and Minister for International Trade
Allan Rock, MP for Etobicoke Centre and Minister of Industry
Brian Tobin, former Premier of Newfoundland

Results

Notes

References

External links
 CBC report from the Convention, Video

2003
2003 elections in Canada
Liberal Party of Canada leadership election